The Wittgenstein family is a German-Austrian family that rose to prominence in 19th- and 20th-century Vienna, Austria.

In 1910, 26 members of the Wittgenstein family were among the 929 wealthiest people in Vienna.

Members of the Wittgenstein family include successful merchants, entrepreneurs, industrialists, lawyers, musicians, patrons of the arts, and philosophers:

Karl Wittgenstein (1847–1913), steel magnate
Margaret Stonborough-Wittgenstein (1882–1958), philanthropist
Paul Wittgenstein (1887–1961), concert pianist
Ludwig Wittgenstein (1889–1951), philosopher

History 

The earliest known family members are the estate manager Ahron Moses Meier (born 1804) and his wife Sarah.

Their son, Moses Meyer, was initially the estate manager of the Counts. In 1806, after the Reichsdeputationshauptschluss, the Wittgensteiner Land fell to Hessen-Darmstadt. In 1808, Napoleon initiated the Jewish emancipation and Jews were required to adopt a fixed surname within three months. Moses chose the name Meyer-Wittgenstein. This led to a conflict with the Prussian , who had been elevated to Reichsfürst in 1804. Moses left the Wittgensteiner Land with his family and moved to the nearby Principality of Waldeck. It was there that he created a successful business as a wool trader in the former Hanseatic City Korbach, an area with many sheep.

Selected members 
Moses Meyer-Wittgenstein (born 1761 in Laasphe; died 3 January 1822 in Korbach), married Bernhardine (Breindel) Simon (1768–1829)
Simson Moses Wittgenstein (8 December 1788 – 22 March 1853), married on 4 October 1813 in Rheda to Rebecca Rosenberg (born 2 May 1783; died 15 April 1854 in Korbach)
Friedrike Wittgenstein (born  1820), married on 6 August 1850 to Isaac Koppel (born  1815)
Marcus Wittgenstein (born  1818 in Korbach; died 1828 in Korbach)
 (born 1 April 1819 in Korbach; died 3 June 1890 in Berlin by suicide), married Clara Lippert (divorced on 22 May 1871 from the Stadtgericht Berlin), estate manager in Berlin from 1858, founder of "Simson and Rebecca Wittgenstein Stiftung" (1884) and the "Jacob Wittgenstein`sche Altersversorgungsanstalt" (1894)
Julia Wittgenstein (born 1790 in Korbach), married Rosenberg
Abraham Wittgenstein (born  1791 in Korbach), married Julie Fontheim
Sophie Wittgenstein (born 19 February 1821; died 31 May 1892 in Amsterdam), married Salomon Berg (born 19 January 1804; died 1891 in Warburg)
Emma (Eva) Wittgenstein (born 1825), married Samuel (Salomon) Nassau (born 1815 in Scherfede)
Hermann Nassau (born 24 September 1859 in Warburg; died 21 April 1933), married Flora Engel (born 6 May 1866 in Dzierżoniów, Poland; died 30 November 1950 in London)
Louis Wittgenstein (born 1834; died 1919 in Warburg), married Lina Berg (born 1837 in Warburg; died 14 July 1909 in Warburg)
Julia Wittgenstein (born 4 May 1862 in Warburg; died 9 April 1943 in Sobibór, Poland)
Alfred Wittgenstein (born 10 August 1863 in Warburg), antique dealer in Nice (France), married on 18 May 1897 (Paris IXe) to Henriette Sophie Dreyfus (born 25 January 1873 in Paris)
Gerard Wittgenstein (1905–1970), married Violette Diedesheim (born  1905; died 1970)
Francois Wittgenstein (born  1940; deceased)
Maryse Wittgenstein (born  1940; deceased)
Selma Wittgenstein (born 20 April 1865 in Warburg; died 7 November 1946 in Rijsenburg, Utrechtse Heuvelrug, Netherlands), married Willy Michaëlis Schüler (born 1865; died 19 October 1939 in The Hague, Netherlands)
Maggy Schüler (born 11 December 1889 in Rotterdam; died 7 July 1944 in Auschwitz), married Dr. Erich Franz Emil Salomon (born 28 April 1886 in Berlin; died 7 July 1944 in Auschwitz)
Otto Erich Salomon (born 1913 in Berlin; died 3 December 2006 in The Hague), name changed to Peter Hunter
Dirk Salomon (born 1920 in Berlin; died 7 July 1944 in Auschwitz)
Dorina Wittgenstein (born 21 January 1866 in Warburg; died 30 November 1939 in The Hague), married Nathan Heinemann
Regina Heinemann (born 21 May 1894 in Amsterdam; died 23 May 1961 in Bentveld, Zandvoort, Netherlands)
Margot Heinemann (born 16 August 1895 in Amsterdam)
Mathilde (Tilly) Heinemann (born 15 February 1897 in Amsterdam; died 29 May 1935 in The Hague)
Sophie Wittgenstein (born 11 June 1869 in Warburg; died 9 October 1946 in The Hague), married Edmund Cohn
Emma Wittgenstein (born 1876 in Warburg; died 1933), married Abraham (Walter) Herz (born 1878 in Aachen; died 1936)
Berta Grete Herz (born 25 February 1906 in Aachen; died 1988)
Paul Aron Herz (born 27 July 1907 in Aachen; died 1966), married Kurt Siegmund Hermann Robert Prenzlau (1892–1945)
Inge Prenzlau (born 30 August 1931 in Berlin), married on 20 June 1953 in Amsterdam to Salomon (Lo) Vecht
Claudia Louise Vecht (born 22 October 1954 in Amsterdam), married Michael Mogendorff
Ronald Arthur Vecht (born 3 April 1958 in Amsterdam), married Fanny van der Linden on 11 May 1997
David Edward Vecht (born 18 September 1997 in Amsterdam)
Lisa Herz
Rosalie (Rosa) Wittgenstein (born 4 December 1867 in Warburg; died 1 November 1949 in Amsterdam), married on 19 February 1889 to Joseph Cohen (born 25 October 1860 in Dinslaken; died 2 March 1924). Founders of the Maison de Bonneterie, Amsterdam
Iwan Wittgenstein, married Theodora (Dorle) Freund
Gert Wittgenstein (born 14 November 1923 in Goleniów, Poland; died 1944 in Auschwitz)
Harry Wittgenstein (born  1870 in Warburg)
Richard Simon Wittgenstein (born 1796; died 13 February 1862), married Ida (born 1809 in Bielefeld; died 3 July 1880 in Geibsdorf)
Louise Johanne Henriette Wittgenstein (born 1831), married Heinrich Hirsch (born 5 May 1840)
Emma Flora Caroline Wittgenstein (1833–1879)
Max Adolf Georg Carl Wittgenstein (born 1836)
Ernst Oscar Wittgenstein (born 1844), married Emma Vaerst
 (born 15 September 1802 in Korbach; died 19 May 1878 in Vienna-Hietzing), wool trader in Gohlis and estate manager in Vienna, converted to Protestantism in 1839, married Franziska (Fanny) Figdor (born 7 April 1814 in Kittsee; died 21 October 1890 in Vienna-Hietzing)
Anna Friederike Wittgenstein (born 31 October 1840 in Gohlis; died 22 September 1896 in Hietzing), married Heinrich "Emil" Franz (born 9 December 1839 in Vienna; died 24 March 1884 in Vienna)
Marie Wittgenstein (1841–1931), married Moritz Christian Pott (1839–1902; iron merchant)
Paul Josef Gustav Wittgenstein (1842–1928), jurist, married Justine Karoline Hochstetter (1858–1918)
Johanna Salzer (1877–1953)
Hermann Christian Wittgenstein (1879–1953)
Paul Karl Wittgenstein (1880–1948)
 (1907–1979), philosopher 
Josephine Wittgenstein (1844–1933), married  (1833–1912)
Ludwig "Louis" Wittgenstein (1845–1925), owner of Schloss Hollenburg, married Maria Franz (1850–1912)
Karl Otto Clemens Wittgenstein (born 1847 in Vienna; died 1913)
Hermine Wittgenstein (born 1874 in Teplitz; died 1950)
Dora Wittgenstein (born 1876 in Vienna; died at birth)
Hans Wittgenstein (born 1877 in Vienna; died 1902 in the Chesapeake Bay, presumed suicide by drowning)
Kurt Wittgenstein (born 1878 in Vienna; died November 1918, shot himself on the Italian front)
Helene Wittgenstein (born 1879 in Vienna; died 1956) married Max Salzer (ministry official)
Rudolf Wittgenstein (born 1881 in Vienna; died 1904 in Berlin by suicide) chemistry student
Margaret Stonborough-Wittgenstein (1882–1958), married Jerome Stonborough in 1904.
Paul Wittgenstein (1887–1961), concert pianist, married Hilde Schania (1915–2001)
Paul-Louis Wittgenstein (born 1941)
Elisabeth
Johanna
Ludwig Wittgenstein (1889–1951), philosopher
Ottilie Ida Bertha Wittgenstein (1848–1908) landowner, cheese producer and patron of the arts in Pyhra, married  (1841–1925)
Paula Franziska Johanna Kupelwieser (1875–1938), married Mathes
Ida Josepha Johanna Kupelwieser (1870–1927), married Lenz
Ernst Hermann Leopold Kupelwieser (1873–1892)
Johann Paul Kupelwieser (1879–1939), medical doctor
Klara Wittgenstein (1850–1935)
Lydia Wittgenstein (1851–1920), married von Siebert
Emilie Wittgenstein (1853–1939), married Theodor von Brücke (1853–1918; judge)
Klothilde Wittgenstein (1854–1937)

References

Notes

 
Wittgenstein
Wittgenstein